Marianne Namshali Mdee (born June 21, 1992) popularly known by her stage name Mimi Mars is a Tanzanian singer, actress and media personality.

Biography

Mars was born on June 21, 1992, in Paris, France. She is the daughter of a former Tanzanian ambassador in France, Sammy Mdee, and Sophia Mdee. She is the sister of Tanzanian television presenter and singer, Vanessa Mdee who is married to an American actor, Rotimi.

Mars holds a LL.B from Kampala International University in Tanzania.

Career
Music career
Mars started her music career in 2017. In late 2018, Mars released her first ever extended playlist called, 'The Road' that had six tracks. In 2019 she was a part of Coke Studio Africa 2019 as an upcoming artist. She has since worked with RJ The DJ, Barnaba Classic, AY, Dogo Janja, Marioo and notable names in the Eastern African Music.

Acting career
Mars debuted as an actress in 2019 when she played 'Sophia' in 'You again', a film directed and Starred by a Kenyan actor, Nick Mutuma.

In 2021, She played 'Maria' in 'Jua Kali', a drama series airs on DStv's Maisha Majic Bongo alongside TID, RJ The DJ, Godliver Gordian, Beatrice Taisamo, Van Vicker, Patience Ozokwor and Sho Madjozi.

Filmography
Movies

Television

Discography

Extended playlist
2018:The Road
Singles
Niguse
One Night ft Kagwe Mungai
Ringtone
Mua
Niache
Mdogo mdogo ft Nikki wa Pili.

Single releases
Lala ft Marioo
Una ft Young Lunya & Marioo
Ohoo ft Baddest 47
Mi Casa Su Casa
Maua
Wenge
Ex ft Mwana FA
Sitamani
Haima maana
Kondoo
Papara
Ex
Dede
Shuga
One night ft Kagwe Mungai
Mdogo mdogo ft Nikki wa Pili

Collaboration
Christmas EP (with Vanessa mdee & Tommy Flavour)

References

External links

1992 births
African Christians
Living people
21st-century Tanzanian women
People from Arusha Region
Swahili-language singers
Tanzanian musicians
Tanzanian Bongo Flava musicians
Kampala International University alumni